Sally J. Rogers is professor of MIND Institute and department of Psychiatry and Behavioral Sciences at the University of California, Davis. She is a scientist working on early diagnosis and interventions methods for autism and other neurodevelopmental disorders. She is a pioneer in the field of autism treatment and pioneered the development of The Early Start Denver Model (ESDM). She has published nearly two-hundred papers on the field of autism, early diagnosis and treatments.

Early life 
Rogers was born in Oberlin, Ohio in 1950.

Education 
Rogers attended Colby College in Waterville, Maine from 1965 to 1967 and Ashland College in Ashland, Ohio, where she earned her Bachelor of Arts in June 1969. Rogers then attended The Ohio State University in Columbus, Ohio to study Developmental Psychology, earning her Master of Arts in June 1973 and her Doctor of Philosophy in March 1975. During this time, Rogers completed an internship from September 1972 to August 1973 at Orient State Institute in Orient, Ohio. Rogers was supervised by Henry Leland, Ph.D..

Research and Career 

Rogers acted as Staff Psychologist and Acting Director in the Psychology Department at Orient State Institute from September 1973 to May 1974.

In the 1980s, Rogers began working on the Early Start Denver Model alongside clinical psychologist and autism researcher Geraldine Dawson. While the EDSM has since been translated into more than 16 languages and has been utilized across the world, it is also representative of applied behavior analysis (ABA), which has faced criticism from some autistic individuals and autism scholars.

In 2022, Rogers received the Lifetime Achievement Award from the International Society for Autism Research.

References

Living people
Year of birth missing (living people)
Place of birth missing (living people)
University of California, Davis faculty
21st-century American women scientists
American scientists